The defense industry of Russia is a strategically important sector and a large employer in Russia. Combined, the US and Russia account for 57% of all major weapons exports.

The Russian government has announced its intention to restructure the debts of Russian military–industrial complex in the amount of 750 billion rubles, half of this amount will be written off, Deputy Prime Minister,  Yuri Borisov said, speaking at a board of the Ministry of Industry and Trade of Tatarstan.

President Vladimir Putin considers the Syrian Civil War to be a good platform for advertisement of the capabilities of Russian weapons capable of boosting Russia's military sales.

Economic significance
Russia's defense industry employs 2.5 – 3 million people and accounts for 20% of all manufacturing jobs in Russia. Sevmash directly employs 27,000 people. The combined revenue of the industry's 20 largest companies in 2009 was $12.25 billion. Russian shipbuilders and naval missile manufacturers survived the difficult period of transition from a command to a market-driven economy, and kept skills needed for the development of advanced combat systems. With recently won orders for Project 955 and Project 885 submarines, the share of domestic military orders in Sevmash's portfolio has risen to above 70%.

Visiting Severodvinsk in February, deputy premier of the Russian Government in charge of defense industry, Dmitry Rogozin said the local shipbuilders are contracted to build eight fourth-generation nuclear submarines by 2020, and that more orders are coming. He further said the earlier program for scrapping third-generation submarines is being revised so that "these vessels will get newer missiles and be subjected to a series of repair efforts enabling them to serve for another seven years".

In November 2011, the Russian defense ministry awarded Sevmash contracts for construction of four Project 955A Borey-A strategic underwater cruisers armed with the Bulava intercontinental ballistic missiles. This order comes after construction of three Project 955 Boreys (Yuri Dolgorukiy, Aleksander Nevsky and Vladimir Monomakh). The Russian Navy also ordered five Project 885M Yasen-M fast attack submarines, in addition to the head vessel, the K-329 Severodvinsk. The exact sum of these contracts has not been made public. It is only known that the Alexander Nevsky was built under contract worth 23 billion Rubles.

The last nuclear powered surface combatant built in St. Petersburg was the Peter the Great. The 23,800-tonne cruiser, fourth and the last in the Atlant series (after Ushakov, Lazarev and Nakhimov) was commissioned in 1998, and serves with the Northern Fleet. Saint Petersburg shipbuilders continue to work on civil projects. They have completed one floating nuclear electric power generation station known as Project 20870 with displacement of 21,500 tons. Six more such stations and five nuclear-powered ice-breakers are on order. During the last 20 years Moscow has repeatedly tried to attract the Turkish military with its advanced technology.

A new attempt was made at the IDEF 2013 exhibition. Russia presented its Ka-50-based Ka-52 Alligator attack helicopter and the Mi-28NE Night Hunter. The proposal to start joint development of a surface-to-air missile system with Ankara was perhaps the most intriguing development of IDEF 2013. The SAM would be based on the Russian S-300V Antey-2500 system. Besides the Antey, Moscow has offered the Buk-M2E and the Tor-M2E surface-to-air missile system, and the Pantsir-S1 combined missile and artillery system. Exhibited mock-ups included the T-90S tank, Terminator fire support combat vehicle, the BMP-3M infantry combat vehicle, the BTR-80 and the BTR-80A Armored Personnel Carriers, the Smerch multiple rocket launcher, the Kornet and the Metis-M anti-tank missile systems, the Msta-S 152-millimeter howitzer, the 2S9 120-millimeter self-propelled mortar, and the Vena self-propelled automated artillery system.

Turkey was the first NATO member country to build close military and technical ties with Moscow. Peru will sign a contract to upgrade Lima's fleet of Mikoyan MiG-29 Fulcrum fighters, Peru is interested in buying 700 Kamaz trucks and a new batch of Mi-8/Mi-17 helicopters from Russia. Peru is also considering buying 100 T-90S tanks.

State orders

During the crisis years of the Russian economy, the country's military industry survived mainly on exports. Today, domestic military procurement is an important source of income for the industry. State orders for military equipment have risen considerably during the last decade. While in 2002, the State Defense Order amounted to only RUB 62 billion, by 2007 the sum had risen to RUB 302.7 billion. When calculated in constant 2000 prices, this represents an increase by a factor of two.

The State Defense Order for 2009 was expected to amount to a record of RUB 1.2 trillion, showing an increase of RUB 70 billion from the previous year. The order was expected to be raised by a further RUB 40 billion for 2010, and by RUB 60 billion for 2011.  Military-Industrial Commission of Russia is responsible for supervising the distribution and implementation of the State Defense Order. In 2005, Putin initiated an industry consolidation programme to bring the main aircraft producing companies under a single umbrella organization, the United Aircraft Corporation (UAC). The aim was optimize production lines and minimize losses. The program was divided in three parts: reorganization and crisis management (2007–2010), evolution of existing projects (2010–2015) and further progress within the newly created structure (2015–2025). The State Duma Defense Committee has announced that the nation's defense spending, including research and development R&D spending, will total $16.3 billion (RUB487 billion) in 2010, $19.2 billion (RUB574 billion) in 2011, $24.3 billion (RUB726 billion) in 2012, and $38.8 billion (RUB1.16 trillion) in 2013. While total defense spending will increase, the amount allocated for R&D will drop from the current 2010 level of 22 to 16 percent by 2013. The modernization of weaponry will instead receive a significant portion of total spending, with 13 percent designated for the 2010 fiscal year, 15 percent for 2011 and 2012, and 14 percent for 2013. The top procurement priorities are the following: RS-24 intercontinental ballistic missiles, Bulava submarine-launched ballistic missiles, Su-24 fighters, Su-35 long-range fighters, submarines, corvettes, frigates, and battlefield command-and-control systems. The plan for 2010-2013 only represents a small portion (16%) of that amount, just over RUB2.9 trillion ($98.6 billion). The government intends to spend RUB19 trillion ($613 billion) over the next decade to modernize the armed forces.
The UAC, one of the so-called national champions and comparable to EADS in Europe, enjoyed considerable financial support from the Russian government, and injected money to the companies it had acquired to improve their financial standing. The deliveries of civilian aircraft increased to 6 in 2005, and in 2009 the industry delivered 15 civilian aircraft, worth 12.5 billion roubles, mostly to domestic customers. Since then Russia has successfully tested the fifth generation jet fighter, Sukhoi Su-57, and started the commercial production of the regional airliner Sukhoi Superjet 100, as well as started developing a number of other major projects. 
Putin created the United Shipbuilding Corporation in 2007, which led to the recovery of shipbuilding in Russia. Since 2006, much efforts were put into consolidation and development of the Rosatom Nuclear Energy State Corporation, which led to the renewed construction of nuclear power plants in Russia as well as a vast activity of Rosatom abroad, buying huge shares in world's leading uranium production companies and building nuclear power plants in many countries, including India, Iran, China, Vietnam and Belarus. In 2007, the Russian Nanotechnology Corporation was established, aimed to boost the science and technology and high-tech industry in Russia. The gist of the new system is to encourage industry to continually reduce manufacturing expenses and improve resource management. Manufacturer profits are made directly dependent on savings it achieves during the series production of modern weapons. This requires more effective resource management, cutting manufacturing costs and making production more economically efficient.

Exports

In 2012, Russia's military exports hit another record sum of $15 billion the structure of military exports had become more balanced. The biggest sales were in aviation equipment – 37 percent. Total exports of land-based weapons and military equipment grew to 27 percent. At the same time, the shares of naval equipment and anti-aircraft systems increased to 18 percent and 15 percent, respectively. Russia is the world's second largest conventional arms exporter after the United States. In 2012, Rosoboronexport received 1,877 enquiries from foreign clients, and, following consideration of the applications, 1,309 contracts were signed. This is 2.5 times more than in 2011.  The most popular types of weaponry bought from Russia are Sukhoi and MiG fighters, air defense systems, helicopters, tanks, armored personnel carriers and infantry fighting vehicles. Russian arms were exported to 60 countries. The most significant supplies went to countries in Southeast Asia and the Asia-Pacific region – 43 percent. The second most significant market remains the Near and Middle East, together with North Africa – 23 percent. For the period 2014–18, the Stockholm International Peace Research Institute, SIPRI, found that Russian exports of major weapons had increased by 17 per cent between 2009-2013 and 2014–18. Russia delivered weapons to 56 states and to rebel forces in eastern Ukraine in 2010–14.

Since 2007, the government-controlled consortium Rosoboronexport has had a legal monopoly on Russian arms exports. All exports must proceed through Rosoboronexport, although 22 firms are allowed to independently export spare parts and components. In 2010, total Russian arms exports amounted to $10 billion. Rosoboronexport's share was $8.6 billion, with independent suppliers making up the difference.

The Moscow-based independent military think-tank Centre for Analysis of Strategies and Technologies has analysed the identified exports of Russian weapons in the year 2009. The share of different weapon types was the following: 61% Aerospace, 21% Ground, 9% Naval, 8% Air Defense and 1% other. In 2010–11, Algeria was the top customer (with an export share of 29%), followed by India (25%) (once India was the largest importer in terms of quantity, and it is still the largest importer in terms of value/money paid) and China (10%). Vietnam became Russia's largest weapons customer in terms of new contracts signed in 2009, especially due to a large order for six Project 636M Kilo-class submarines. Vietnam is expected to considerably increase its share of Russian arms exports in the future. Russia's military exports between 2008 and 2011 amounted to $29.8 billion. The top three customers were India ($8.2 billion), Algeria ($4.7 billion) and China ($3.5 billion). These importers accounted for 55.47 percent of its total exports during that period.

As of 2012, Russia has managed to maintain its position as the number two exporter of arms to the world in spite of losing sales in some markets such as Libya and India, by selling products to new markets in Africa and Latin America."Between 2012 and 2015, India will once again become the number one importer ($14.3 billion), followed by Venezuela ($3.2 billion) instead of Algeria. Vietnam will rank third, with imports of $3.2 billion.that the Asia-Pacific now accounts for more than half of the company's deliveries. In recent years Russia approved about $7 billion worth of export loans under weapons contracts. This has enabled Rosoboron export to sign new deals with Myanmar, Malaysia, Indonesia, Sri Lanka and Vietnam.
Moscow is determined to keep its share of the Indian defense market and to retain its status as the world's second-largest defence exporter. Last year Rosoboronexport signed $17.6 billion worth of new contracts, which represents an increase of 150 percent compared to 2011. The company's portfolio of contracts has reached an impressive $37.3 billion. Russia ranks second in the world's arms export. Moscow supplies arms and military equipment to 66 countries, has concluded agreements on military and technical cooperation with 85 countries and its portfolio of orders for defence-related products currently stands at a staggering $46.3 billion. Russian global arms exports reached $15.2 billion in 2012, up 12% compared to the previous year said Venezuela, Peru, Brazil, Argentina and Mexico were interested in buying helicopters and air defense systems. Grigory Kozlov, head of Helicopter Export Department at Rosoboronexport, said there is good potential for cooperation virtually with all the countries in the region, and especially with Brazil, where Mi-35M helicopters are successfully used. The main partner in the region is a traditional friend of Russia – Venezuela. It is now the second biggest purchaser of Russian arms, after India, that Russia needs to press ahead.
The Sukhoi Su-57 fifth generation fighter and the BrahMos supersonic multiple usage cruise missile are the most visible outcomes of joint venture production with India. The Center for Analysis of the World Arms Trade estimates the value of equipment acquired by Caracas from the Russian defence industry at $4.4 billion. This includes 24 Su-30MK2V fighters, 100,000 AK-103 assault rifles, more than 40 Mi-17V-5 multipurpose helicopters, 10 Mi-35M2 attack helicopters, three Mi-26T2 heavy transport helicopters and 5,000 SVD sniper rifles. India is working on two co-design defense projects with Russia – the FGFA and the Multi-role Transport Aircraft, which is already in detailed design stage.

Recently, Russia has made arms deals with UAE, Saudi Arabia, Iraq and Egypt.

Legal basis
Before 1998, the Russian Federation did not have a comprehensive export control law, inheritance from the Soviet Union, in which legal basis for many things was unclear or secret. The legal basis for export control procedures rested on several presidential decrees, government resolutions and a federal law on state regulation of foreign economic activity (1995). From 1992 to 1997 Russia developed control lists for missile, biological, chemical, nuclear and dual-use related items and issued regulations governing the export of these items. At the time, Russian exporters of controlled items were required to obtain two licenses, one from the Federal Service for Currency and Export Control (VEK, under the authority of the Ministry of Defence), and another from the Ministry of Trade. Since 3 July 1998 (the date on which the State Duma adopted a comprehensive federal law on 'Military-Technical Cooperation of the Russian Federation with Foreign States'), the only body competent to deliver
a license has operated under the authority of the Ministry of Defense. With regard dual-use goods and services, the Russian government issued a "catch all" export control regulation in a resolution signed on 22 January 1998. Under the resolution, Russian firms are forbidden to sell dual-use goods if they know they will be used in WMD, even if the items are not specifically mentioned on 'control lists'. A comprehensive federal law 'On export control' took effect on 29 July 1999. The law provides, that export control lists should be drawn up by the President, in consultation with the Parliament and industry representatives. This represents a significant change from previous regulations, which gave the executive
branch sole discretion over the contents of the lists. In this respect, the law provides a new foundation for export control policy, empowering other actors than those from simply the executive branch.

Companies
 
 
According to Centre for Analysis of Strategies and Technologies (CAST), the most successful businesses in the sector are aerospace and air defense companies. The centre's 2007 rating puts the air defense missile producer Almaz-Antey in the top position (revenue of $3.122 billion), followed by Sukhoi ($1.863 billion) and Irkut Corporation ($1.207 billion). These companies employ 81,857, over 30,000 and 11,585 people, respectively. Across the top 20 rated companies, growth in military production averaged more than 25% in 2007.

In 2008, the combined revenue of Russia's top 10 military-industrial companies grew by 26% from the previous year, amounting to almost $12 billion. The top company was again Almaz-Antey, which boosted its revenue to $4.3 billion. Russian Helicopters produced 122 aircraft in 2008, increasing its revenue from $724 million to $1.7 billion. Uralvagonzavod earned $640 million by making 175 T-90 tanks: 62 for the Russian military, 60 for India, and 53 for Algeria, according to CAST.

The six largest companies of the industry in 2009, based on revenue, were:
Almaz-Antey – air defense systems
United Aircraft Corporation – fixed-wing airplanes
Tactical Missiles Corporation – air- and naval-based missiles
Russian Helicopters – helicopters
Uralvagonzavod – main battle tanks
United Shipbuilding Corporation- submarines, corvettes, frigates, aircraft carriers.

Problems
Problems in the industry include a high level of debt, inflation and lack of qualified personnel. Significant portions of the increases in Russia's military procurement budget are being eaten up by inflation: while the country's overall inflation rate in 2008 was 13%, in certain weapon categories the figure was more than 30%. Many skilled workers are nearing retirement age, and young graduates are hesitant to enter the industry due to low wages and insufficient career opportunities. Further growth will require a serious upgrade of production facilities, as well as investment in skills and training. Yury Solomonov, chief designer of the Topol-M and Bulava ICBMs, has said that Russia is 10–15 years ahead of its rivals in the development of strategic nuclear weapons, but 30 years behind in the development of conventional arms. After collapse of the Soviet Union, Russia's nuclear shipbuilding industry has been transformed into something much smaller. Key enterprises on the Black Sea coast appeared to be on the territory of now-independent Ukraine - which proclaimed non-nuclear status. Admittedly, these enterprises had little to do with nuclear propulsion technology, except for some ambitions in the late 1980s when the Soviet navy planned the construction of nuclear-powered aircraft carriers. Russian defense industry proved unequal to the challenge of manufacturing battleships and other BMP-3, BMD heavy combatants T-90 tanks, artillery, missiles, space technology, nuclear technology even lack of funds from state.

See also
Armed Forces of the Russian Federation
Military-Industrial Commission of Russia
List of Russian weaponry
List of Russian weaponry makers
List of Russian aerospace engineers
List of Russian naval engineers
Shipbuilding in Russia
Aircraft industry of Russia
Future of the Russian Navy
Russian Navy
Russia and weapons of mass destruction
Russian Aerospace Defense Forces
Strategic Missile Troops
Universal Combat Platform T-99
UAC/HAL Il-214
Sukhoi/HAL FGFA

References

Russia
Industry in Russia